Paramakatoi is an Amerindian community in the Potaro-Siparuni Region of Guyana, located in the Pacaraima Mountains.

History
Paramakatoi is part of the traditional lands of the indigenous Patamona peoples.

The village name comes from the name of the nearby creek, which is surrounded by Palamaka plants, and "toi" means savannah in the Patamona language. "Palamakatoi" became "Paramakatoi" when missionaries arrived in the area.

Description 
Paramakatoi functions as a regional centre for the catchment area. It is the largest and most developed of the Amerindian communities in the region, and is home to the Patamona, Macushi and Wapishana tribes. 

It has a secondary school and has participated in the Hinterland Employment Youth Service (HEYS) programme since 2016.

The village has a processing factory for sun-dried tomato products.

In 2019, Paramakatoi hosted a debate held in the Patamona language, in observance of the International Year of Indigenous Languages.

Transport

Paramakatoi is served by the Paramakatoi Airport.

References

External links

Populated places in Potaro-Siparuni
Indigenous villages in Guyana